Aaron Lim (born 22 June 1985) is a Malaysian racing driver. He was born in Selangor, and has competed in such series as Formula V6 Asia and A1 Grand Prix for A1 Team Malaysia.

He has been the regular driver for Honda Malaysia Racing Team since 2007.

References

External links
 Career statistics from Driver Database

1985 births
Living people
Malaysian people of Chinese descent
Malaysian Buddhists
Malaysian racing drivers
A1 Team Malaysia drivers
Formula BMW Asia drivers
Formula V6 Asia drivers
People from Selangor